Brittney LaDawn Williams (October 10, 1989) is an American character designer and comic artist.  She has worked on comics such as Patsy Walker, A.K.A. Hellcat! with Kate Leth and Goldie Vance with Hope Larson. She has also done character design for DC Super Hero Girls.

Biography
Brittney Williams graduated from South Carolina State University with a degree in Graphic Design.

Bibliography

Archie Comics
Betty & Veronica: The Bond of Friendship (artist)

Boom! Studios 
 Goldie Vance (artist)
 Garfield (artist)
 Rugrats: R is for Reptar 2018 Special (artist)

DC Comics
 Shade, the Changing Girl  (artist)
 Lois Lane and the Friendship Challenge (artist)

Dynamite Entertainment
 Rainbow Brite (artist)

Graphic India 
 Stan Lee's Chakra The Invincible (artist)

IDW 
 Samurai Jack (artist)
 Cartoon Network: Super Secret Crisis War!: Foster's Home for Imaginary Friends (artist)

Marvel Comics 
 Patsy Walker, A.K.A. Hellcat! (artist)
 Secret Wars, Too (2015) #1 (artist)

See also
List of women in comics

References

External links

1989 births
Living people
21st-century American women artists
American female comics artists
People from Burbank, California